The Loudest Voice in the Room: How the Brilliant, Bombastic Roger Ailes Built Fox News – and Divided a Country is a 2014 biographical book about Fox News president Roger Ailes written by Gabriel Sherman, which debuted at #9 on The New York Times Bestseller list.

Sherman spent $100,000 from his advance to have two fact-checkers go through the book.

TV adaptation

A television series based on the Sherman book premiered in 2019 on Showtime. It stars Russell Crowe as Roger Ailes and Naomi Watts as Gretchen Carlson.

References

External links

Presentation by Sherman on The Loudest Voice in the Room, February 15, 2014
After Words interview with Sherman on The Loudest Voice in the Room, March 1, 2014

English-language books
Random House books
2014 non-fiction books
Biographies (books)
Works about Fox News